Rangin Ban (also Romanized as Rangīn Bān and Rangīn Bon; also known as Rangīn Bān-e Bāzvand) is a village in Bazvand Rural District, Central District, Rumeshkhan County, Lorestan Province, Iran. At the 2006 census, its population was 1,551, in 324 families.

References 

Populated places in Rumeshkhan County